The Athens Metro is a rapid transit system serving the Athens urban area and parts of East Attica. As of 10 October 2022, there are 66 stations on three different lines. 62 of the 66 stations are owned and operated by Urban Rail Transport S.A. (STASY): three stations (and ) are owned by the Hellenic Railways Organisation and operated by Hellenic Train, while the  station is owned and operated by the airport authority that owns and manages Athens International Airport.

The opening of the second phase of the Line 3 extension towards Piraeus, in October 2022, added two new stations to the network ( and ), bringing the total to 66.

Overview

All Athens Metro trains and stations are accessible for wheelchair users.

Stations

Listed for each of the 66 stations are the lines serving it, the local authority in which it is located, and the date when it opened. The spelling of the station names on this table, in English and Greek, are according to the signage.

Station layouts 

Most Athens Metro stations have two tracks and two side platforms. The following stations have a different layout:

Future stations

Construction of the first stage of Line 4 began on 22 June 2021, with a target completion date of 2029. The project will create fourteen new stations and make Evangelismos an interchange station with Line 3. All the stations will be underground. Except for Evangelismos, the spelling of the station names on this table, in English and Greek, are according to Attiko Metro (the infrastructure manager of the Athens Metro).

See also

List of Athens Tram stops
List of Thessaloniki Metro stations
Greek railway stations

Notes

References

Athens

Metro
Greece transport-related lists